Mwila is a name of Zambian origin that may refer to:
Mwila Phiri (born 1994), Zambian footballer 
Benjamin Mwila (1943–2013), Zambian politician and businessman
Boyd Mwila (born 1984), Zambian football striker 
Brian Mwila (born 1994), Zambian footballer
Freddie Mwila (born 1946), Zambian former association football player
Keith Mwila (1966–1993), Zambian boxer
Numba Mwila (1972–1993), Zambian footballer 

Names of the Democratic Republic of the Congo
Zambian surnames
Lozi-language surnames